Peter Andersson may refer to:

Peter Andersson (actor) (born 1953), Swedish actor
Peter Andersson (basketball) (born 1958), Swedish Olympic basketball player
Peter Andersson (musician) (born 1973), Swedish musician with Raison D'être
Peter Andersson (Lina Baby Doll), Swedish musician with Deutsch Nepal
Peter Andersson (ice hockey b. 1962)
Peter Andersson (ice hockey b. 1965)
Peter Andersson (ice hockey b. 1991)

See also
Peter Anderson (disambiguation)
Peter Andersen (disambiguation)